Melicope kaalaensis is a species of plant in the family Rutaceae known by the common name Kaala melicope. I

It is endemic to the Waianae Range on Oahu island, in the Hawaiian Islands.

It is threatened by habitat loss.

References

kaalaensis
Endemic flora of Hawaii
Biota of Oahu
Waianae Range
Taxonomy articles created by Polbot